Marius Duhnke (born 20 July 1993) is a German footballer who plays as a striker for TSV Ampfing.

Career
Duhnke played youth football for FV Karlstadt and 1. FC Schweinfurt 05 before joining the Bayern Munich Junior Team in 2008, at the same time that his older brother, Manuel, was signing for the reserve team. He scored prolifically for Bayern's youth teams, including six goals in 35 minutes in an under-17 match against 1860 Munich in 2010, which Bayern won 8–0.

Marius was promoted to the reserve team two years later, although Manuel had since moved on, and made his debut on the opening day of the 2012–13 season, as a substitute for Fabian Hürzeler in a 1–1 draw with FC Augsburg II in the Regionalliga Bayern. He ended the season as Bayern Munich II's top scorer, with fifteen goals, fourteen of which had come in the second half of the season, as the team finished in second place.

Despite this, though, Duhnke left Bayern in July 2013, believing he had little chance of breaking into the first team, and signed for SpVgg Unterhaching of the 3. Liga. He made his debut for the club on the opening day of the 2012–13 season (his 20th birthday) as a substitute for Janik Haberer in a 0–0 draw with Jahn Regensburg.

Career statistics

References

External links
 

1993 births
Living people
Sportspeople from Würzburg
German footballers
Association football forwards
3. Liga players
Regionalliga players
FC Bayern Munich II players
SpVgg Unterhaching players
Footballers from Bavaria
SpVgg Unterhaching II players